The 2011–12 Aruban Division di Honor (also known as the 2011–12 Campeonato AVB Aruba Bank for sponsorship purposes) was the 51st season of top flight association football in Aruba. The season began on 28 September 2011. RCA were the defending champions, having won their 12th title last season.

Teams 
Sporting finished in 10th place at the end of the Regular Stage of last season's competition and were relegated to the Aruban Division Uno. Taking their place were the champions of the Division Uno, Dakota.

River Plate and Juventud TL finished in 8th and 9th place respectively after the Regular Stage the previous and had to play against the 2nd and 3rd place teams from the Division Uno, Brazil Juniors and San Luis Deportivo. River Plate and Juventud Tanki Leendert finished in the top two spots at the end of this playoff and retained their places in the competition.

Regular stage 
The 10 teams in the competition played against every other team in the league twice in this stage of the competition, once at home and once away, for a total of 18 matches each. The top four teams progressed to the Playoff Stage. The 8th and 9th place teams competed in a Promotion/relegation playoff against the 2nd and 3rd place teams from the Division Uno. The 10th place team was relegated to the Division Uno automatically. This stage of the competition began on 28 September 2011.

Table

Results

Playoff stage 
The top four teams at the end of the Regular Stage entered this competition. Each team played against the other three twice each, once at home and once away, for a total of six matches each. The top two teams qualified for the Final Stage.

Final stage

Promotion/relegation playoff 
The 8th and 9th place teams after the Regular Stage entered this competition, along with the 2nd and 3rd place teams from the Division Uno. After six rounds, the top two teams earned a place in the following season's competition.

References

External links 
Division di Honor via AFF
Aruba National League via FIFA.com

Aruban Division di Honor seasons
Aruba
foot
foot